Crazy Ex-Girlfriend is an American television sitcom starring Rachel Bloom

Crazy Ex-Girlfriend may also refer to:
 Crazy Ex-Girlfriend (album) by Miranda Lambert
 "Crazy Ex-Girlfriend" (song) by Miranda Lambert from the album of the same name
 "Crazy Ex-Girlfriend Theme", theme song for the Crazy Ex-Girlfriend sitcom

See also
 My Crazy Ex, LMN television series